Wayne Ryding is an English Paralympic swimmer, who was born in  Wigan and initially competed for Australia. At the 1984 New York/Stoke Mandeville Paralympics, he won a gold medal in the Men's 100 m Freestyle 5 event, in which he set a new world record, and a silver medal in the Men's 400 m Freestyle 5 event. At the 1988 Seoul Paralympics, he won a bronze medal in the Men's 400 m Freestyle 5 event. He then married an Englishwoman and moved to England. He represented England at the 1994 Victoria Commonwealth Games, and represented Great Britain at both the 1996 Atlanta and 2000 Sydney Paralympics; he won a bronze medal at the 2000 games in the Men's 100 m Breaststroke SB6 event.

References

Male Paralympic swimmers of Australia
Paralympic swimmers of Great Britain
Commonwealth Games competitors for England
Swimmers at the 1984 Summer Paralympics
Swimmers at the 1988 Summer Paralympics
Swimmers at the 1994 Commonwealth Games
Swimmers at the 1996 Summer Paralympics
Swimmers at the 2000 Summer Paralympics
Medalists at the 1984 Summer Paralympics
Medalists at the 1988 Summer Paralympics
Medalists at the 2000 Summer Paralympics
Paralympic gold medalists for Australia
Paralympic silver medalists for Australia
Paralympic bronze medalists for Australia
Paralympic bronze medalists for Great Britain
Paralympic medalists in swimming
S8-classified Paralympic swimmers
British male freestyle swimmers
British male breaststroke swimmers
Sportspeople from Wigan
Year of birth missing (living people)
Living people